Unterach is a village in the Austria state of Upper Austria on the southern shore of lake Attersee in the centre of the Salzkammergut region.

The name derives from the Austro-Bavarian Untr|aha ~ between|waters based on the geographical location on the shore of lake Mondsee and lake Attersee.

Coat of arms 
 In gold a blue diagonal bar, within is a silver fish, complemented by a red heart.
 Town colours: blue-yellow-red

The arms were granted on 1980-08-25 by the government of Upper Austria based on a resolution of the Town Council of 1979-11-09.

Gallery

Politics 
 Mayor Georg Baumann, ÖVP

The town council consists of 19 members. The chair is taken by the mayor who has been elected directly since 1997. (Exception: E. Gnigler got appointed by the town council in 2007.) The 1 to 2 vice-chairs are elected by the town council; likewise the allocation of responsibilities is decided by the town council.

The town council, as of the latest election in 2009, is constituted as follows:
 ÖVP: 10 mandates
 SPÖ: 9 mandates

Historic  election results.

Town communities 
 Au/See
 Ort am Mondsee
 See am Mondsee
 Au
 Unterach
 Mühlleiten
 Village Centre
 Buchenort
 Misling
 Stockwinkel

Neighbouring towns 
 Nußdorf am Attersee
 Oberwang
 Innerschwand
 Mondsee
 St. Gilgen
 Steinbach am Attersee

Lakes 
 Attersee
 Mondsee
 Egelsee (Unterach)

Personalities 
 Viktor Kaplan
 Hugo Wolf
 Johannes Brahms
 Gottfried Keller
 Maria Jeritza
 Heinz Conrads
 Georg Danzer
 Gusti Wolf
 Johanna Matz
 Elisabeth Stiepl
 Karl Schwetter
 Alexander Jenner
 Franz Bauer-Teussl
 Heinrich Schiff
 Cardinal Christoph Schönborn
 Gloria Excelsias

References

 Alfred Mück, Franz Pölzleithner: Unterach am Attersee Chronik - Eigenverlag Gemeinde Unterach 1990
 Knoll, Mayr, Prix: Die elektrische Bahn Unterach-See - Verlag Johannes Heyn 1995, 
 Erich Weidinger: Sagen & Märchen vom Attersee - SECESSION LXXXXVIII 1989
 Gustav Klimt: Notizbuch Unterach am Attersee - Verlag Brandstätter 2001, 
 Thomas Bernhard: Die Mütze - 1966 (location), in Die Erzählungen - Suhrkamp 1979,

External links 

 Tourist board
 
 Webcam

Cities and towns in Vöcklabruck District